The Columbia Plateau is a geologic and geographic region that lies across parts of the U.S. states of Washington, Oregon, and Idaho. It is a wide flood basalt plateau between the Cascade Range and the Rocky Mountains, cut through by the Columbia River.

Geology 

Over a period of perhaps 10 to 15 million years, lava flow after lava flow poured out, ultimately accumulating to a thickness of more than 6,000 feet (1.8  km). As the molten rock came to the surface, the Earth's crust gradually sank into the space left by the rising lava. The Columbia River Basalt Group consists of seven formations: The Steens Basalt, Imnaha Basalt, Grande Ronde Basalt, Picture Gorge Basalt, Prineville Basalt, Wanapum Basalt, and Saddle Mountains Basalt. Many of these formations are subdivided into formal and informal members and flows.

The subsidence of the crust produced a large, slightly depressed lava plateau. The ancient Columbia River was forced into its present course by the northwesterly advancing lava. The lava, as it flowed over the area, first filled the stream valleys, forming dams that in turn caused impoundments or lakes. Entities found in these lake beds include fossil leaf impressions, petrified wood, fossil insects, and bones of vertebrate animals.

Evidence suggests that some concentrated heat source is melting rock beneath the Columbia Plateau Province at the base of the lithosphere (the layer of crust and upper mantle that forms Earth's moving tectonic plates). In an effort to figure out why this area, far from a plate boundary, had such an enormous outpouring of lava, scientists established hardening dates for many of the individual lava flows. They found that the youngest volcanic rocks were clustered near the Yellowstone Plateau and that the farther west they went, the older the lavas.

Although scientists are still gathering evidence, a probable explanation is that a hot spot, an extremely hot plume of deep mantle material, is rising to the surface beneath the Columbia Plateau Province. Beneath Hawaii and Iceland, a temperature instability develops (for reasons not yet well understood) at the boundary between the core and mantle. The concentrated heat triggers a plume hundreds of kilometers in diameter that ascends directly through to the surface of the Earth.

The track of this hot spot starts in the west and sweeps up to Yellowstone National Park. The steaming fumaroles and explosive geysers are ample evidence of a concentration of heat beneath the surface. The hotspot is stationary, but the North American plate is moving over it, creating a superb record of the rate and direction of plate motion.

Flora
Part of the Columbia Plateau is associated with the Columbia Plateau ecoregion, part of the "Nearctic temperate and subtropical grasslands, savannas, and shrublands" ecoregion of the temperate grasslands, savannas, and shrublands biome.

Geography 
Washington cities in the Columbia Plateau include:

 Colfax
 Davenport
 Ellensburg
 Reardan
 Kennewick
 Moses Lake
 Pasco
 Pullman
 Richland
 Spokane
 Walla Walla
 Yakima
 Goldendale
 Deer Park
 Othello
 Warden
 Lind

Oregon cities in the Columbia Plateau include:

 Hermiston
 Hood River
 Pendleton
 The Dalles
 Milton-Freewater

Idaho cities in the Columbia Plateau include:

 Coeur d'Alene
 Lewiston
 Moscow

See also 
 Cascade-Sierra province
 Channeled scablands
 Columbia Plateau Aquifer System
 Grand Coulee
 Interior Plateau
 High Desert (Oregon)

References

External links 

 USGS Page on Columbia Plateau
 Geology of Lake Roosevelt National Recreation Area (source of much of this page)
 Guide to digital documents and photographs about the Columbia River area.
 Columbia River Basin Ethnic History Archive

Columbia River
Physiographic provinces
Large igneous provinces
Volcanism of Washington (state)
Miocene volcanism
Pliocene volcanism
Plateaus of the United States
Landforms of Idaho
Regions of Oregon
Regions of Washington (state)
Landforms of Umatilla County, Oregon
Landforms of Hood River County, Oregon
Landforms of Wasco County, Oregon